is a Japanese actor, reporter, and voice actor.

He has dubbed various movies, TV series, and anime.

Filmography
The Rose of Versailles (1979), La Salle
Ashita no Joe 2 (1980), Referee/reporter
Maya the Honey Bee (1982), Hines
Sasuga no Sarutobi (1982), Vice-principal

Dubbing
Gunfight at the O.K. Corral (1975 TV Tokyo edition), Billy Clanton (Dennis Hopper)

References

External links
 Official agency profile 
 
 Naruhito Iguchi at GamePlaza-Haruka Voice Acting Database 

1951 births
81 Produce voice actors
Japanese male voice actors
Living people
Male voice actors from Niigata Prefecture